Stephen Powell (born 20 September 1955) is an English former professional footballer who played as a midfielder or defender. He spent the majority of his career at Derby County where he played 420 times, placing him in the top ten for total appearances for the club. He also played for Tulsa Roughnecks in the NASL.

Early life
Powell, the son of ex-Derby County player Tommy Powell, went to Gayton Avenue Junior School, in the Littleover suburb of Derby, at the age of 11 he then moved to the Bemrose School just like his father once had many years before him. He is a keen Birmingham City supporter.

Career
While at Bemrose School, Powell impressed the then Derby County managerial team of Brian Clough and Peter Taylor enough for Clough to sign him for Derby County on a visit to the school premises. Powell then went on to make his first team debut aged 16 years and 30 days in a Texaco Cup tie against Stoke City, which Derby County won 3–2. He made his league debut three days later aged 16 years and 33 days in the 2–1 win against Arsenal. Whilst at Derby County, Powell played as defender and midfielder. Powell made 352 appearances in the league for The Rams, scoring twenty goals. Powell won the player of the year (now named the Jack Stamps trophy) in the 1978–79 season.

Powell went from a schoolboy star into an exceptional professional league player. Despite playing in a declining league side towards the end of his Derby County career, Powell was completely dedicated to Derby County. He was part of the team during some of their highest and lowest moments. Derby won the First Division title twice during his time at the club; he made three appearances in the 1971–72 success but played more regularly during the 1974–75 title winning season with 15 appearances. There was also a European Cup semi-final appearance in 1973, relegation to the Second Division in 1980 and relegation to the Third Division in 1984. He retired in 1985 after well over a decade with the Rams, who had missed out on promotion back to the Second Division but would follow it up with two successive promotions.

Powell and his father, Tommy appeared in 826 senior games between them for Derby County.

Powell later worked at Derby College.

Honours
First Division: 1971–72, 1974–75
Texaco Cup: 1972

References

External links

NASL stats
Article at Sporting Heroes

1955 births
Living people
Footballers from Derby
People educated at Bemrose School
English footballers
English expatriate footballers
England under-23 international footballers
Association football midfielders
Association football defenders
Derby County F.C. players
Tulsa Roughnecks (1978–1984) players
English Football League players
North American Soccer League (1968–1984) players
English football managers
Burton Albion F.C. managers
Expatriate soccer players in the United States
English expatriate sportspeople in the United States